Abdulfattah Tawfiq Asiri (born 26 February 1994) is a Saudi Arabian professional footballer  who currently plays for Pro League club Al-Nassr and the Saudi Arabia national team.

International career

Asiri played his first international game with the senior national team on 28 December 2013 against Palestine (0–0), appearing in the starting team line-up and playing the entire match.

Statistics

Club
As of 31 December 2022

International
Statistics accurate as of match played 8 December 2019.

International goals
Scores and results list Saudi Arabia's goal tally first.

Honours

Club
Al-Ittihad
King Cup of Champions: 2013

Al-Nassr
Saudi Super Cup: 2020

References

External links
 
 

1994 births
Living people
People from Jizan Province
Saudi Arabian footballers
Association football wingers
Hetten FC players
Ittihad FC players
Al-Ahli Saudi FC players
Al Nassr FC players
Saudi Professional League players
Saudi Arabia youth international footballers
Saudi Arabia international footballers